Maurice Cary Blake (1 November 1888 – 1969) was an American philatelist who signed the Roll of Distinguished Philatelists in 1962.

References

Signatories to the Roll of Distinguished Philatelists
1888 births
1969 deaths
American philatelists